Sadio Kanouté (born 21 October 1996) is a Malian footballer who plays as a midfielder for Simba Sports Club and the Mali national team.

International career
Kanouté made his professional debut with the Mali national team in a 0–0 2020 African Nations Championship qualification tie with Mauritania on 21 September 2019.

References

External links
 
 

1996 births
Living people
Sportspeople from Bamako
Malian footballers
Mali international footballers
Association football midfielders
Malian Première Division players
2020 African Nations Championship players
21st-century Malian people
Mali A' international footballers
Stade Malien players
Simba S.C. players
Malian expatriate sportspeople in Tanzania
Expatriate footballers in Tanzania
Malian expatriate footballers